is a city located in Fukuoka Prefecture, Japan. The city was founded on April 1, 1954.

As of 2003, the city had an estimated population of 39,372 and a population density of 1,000.81 persons per km². The total area was 39.34 km².

On October 1, 2006 the town of Jōyō (from Yame District) was merged into Yame.

On February 1, 2010, the towns of Kurogi and Tachibana, and the villages of Hoshino and Yabe (all from Yame District) were merged into Yame.

After the merger, as of April 1, 2011, the city has an estimated population of 69,907, with 23,885 households and a population density of 144.88 persons per km². The total area is 482.53 km², which is second largest area within Fukuoka Prefecture.

Yamecha is produced in Yame and surrounding areas, and is a tea known throughout Japan.

Yame natives include former livedoor CEO Takafumi Horie and NiziU leader Mako Yamaguchi (山口真子).

Geography

Climate
Yame has a humid subtropical climate (Köppen: Cfa).

Demographics
Per Japanese census data, the population of Yame in 2020 is 60,608 people. Yame has been conducting censuses since 1950.

See also
 Groups of Traditional Buildings

References

External links

 Yame City official website 
 Brief introduction of Yame tea 

 
Cities in Fukuoka Prefecture
1954 establishments in Japan